The Gaylactic Spectrum Awards are given to works of science fiction, fantasy and horror that explore LGBT (lesbian, gay, bisexual, transgender) topics in a positive way. Established in 1998, the awards were initially presented by the Gaylactic Network, with awards first awarded in 1999. In 2002 the awards were given their own organization, the Gaylactic Spectrum Awards Foundation.

The major award categories are for best novel, short fiction, and other works. The winners and short list of recommended nominees are decided by a jury. One of the most recognized authors, Melissa Scott has received the most awards overall, with five wins. She also holds the record for most nominations. Works of any format produced before the awards were first given were eligible to be inducted into the "Hall of Fame", although no work has been inducted since 2003. The list of award winners and Hall of Fame inductees has been called a "who's who of science fiction" by the GLBTQ Encyclopedia Project. This article lists the winners in each of the categories, and the inductees to the Hall of Fame.

Award process
Since their inception, the awards were given in categories for novels and best other work. Other categories were  also added and removed in intervening years, including categories for short fiction (since the second year) and comic books for one year. A short lived "People's Choice" award voted by convention attendees was also awarded to one work from any of the category nominee short lists. The award for best novel was the only one to have been handed out every year since the awards began.  there were  three regular categories: novels, short fiction and other works. The "other works" category included comic books, graphic novels, movies, television episodes, multimedia, anthologies, story collections, gaming products, artwork, and music.

The categories are  open to submission of English-language works released during the prior calendar year in North America that include "significant positive GLBT content". The time-frame of eligibility is based on copyright date for first printing for written works, cover date for magazines and comic books, release date for films, first air date for television. Works had to have been "professionally" published or distributed to be eligible for consideration and be wholly original and legal. The judges  can choose to extend eligibility for a work due to oversight, confusion regarding release dates, or problems with availability. An open nomination/recommendation process is used to identify works to be considered by the judges. Works of any format produced before the inception of the awards are  eligible to be inducted into the "Hall of Fame"; these inductees were  selected solely by the judges.

The results are  decided by a panel of judges from the list of submitted nominees; nominations can be made by anyone. The judges are  volunteers from science fiction fandom and GLBT community, with one volunteer as the "Award Administrator". The judges review each recommended work and the long list of nominees is reduced via review and discussion to a short list of finalists, and then one or more winners is  chosen by consensus or vote. The results are  generally announced and presented at Gaylaxicon, a convention dedicated to LGBT science fiction, although on occasion they are  presented at Worldcon.

Each award consists of an etched image on lucite on a stand, using a spiral galaxy in a triangle logo, based on the logo of the Gaylactic Network. The award winner's name, work title, award year and category are  etched on a small plaque on the base or on the plexiglass itself. A small cash stipend is also awarded to winners in the Best Novel category. The cost of the awards is paid through individual donations and fundraising events.

Winners

Melissa Scott holds the record for the most award wins (five) and nominations (thirteen). Other authors and editors who have won the award multiple times are Nicola Griffith, David Gerrold, Keith Hartman, Laurie J. Marks, and Stephen Pagel. Samuel R. Delany is notable for winning a special "Lifetime Achievement" award. Steve Berman and Tanya Huff were finalists seven times without winning.

Per Locus database, the most recent award was given in 2019 for novels, in 2010 for short fiction and in 2003 for the hall of fame.

List of winners
In the following table, the years correspond to the year of the award ceremony. The notes column details the type of media for entries in the other works category, or the name of the publication in which the entries were first published in the short fiction category. The years are linked to the appropriate year in literature, comics, television or film articles.

 People's Choice award winner.

Hall of Fame

 People's Choice Award winner.

See also

 LGBT themes in science fiction and fantasy
 LGBT themes in horror fiction
 LGBT themes in comics
 List of science fiction awards
 Lambda Literary Awards winners and nominees for science fiction, fantasy and horror

References

External links
 The Gaylactic Spectrum Awards official site

 
Awards established in 1998
Fantasy awards
Horror fiction awards

LGBT literary awards
Lists of LGBT-related award winners and nominees
Lists of speculative fiction-related award winners and nominees
Science fiction awards